Jorge Cimadevilla (born November 11, 1965) is a former American football placekicker who played seven seasons in the Arena Football League with the Orlando Predators, Tampa Bay Storm and Nashville Kats. He played college football at East Tennessee State University.

References

External links
Just Sports Stats

Living people
1965 births
Players of American football from Georgia (U.S. state)
American football placekickers
East Tennessee State Buccaneers football players
Orlando Predators players
Tampa Bay Storm players
Nashville Kats players
People from Decatur, Georgia
Sportspeople from DeKalb County, Georgia